Addisu Yihune (born 17 March 2003) is an Ethiopian long-distance runner. He notably won the 5000 metres at the 2022 World Athletics U20 Championships. He also won the 2022 Cross de San Sebastián and Campaccio cross-country races.

References

2003 births
Living people
Ethiopian male long-distance runners
World Athletics U20 Championships winners